Pavlos Melas is a municipality in the regional unit of Thessaloniki, Central Macedonia, Greece. It is named after a Greek revolutionary officer of the Macedonian Struggle, Pavlos Melas. It was formed during the administrative reform introduced by the Kallikratis plan and encompasses the former municipalities of Efkarpia, Polichni and Stavroupoli. The seat of Pavlos Melas is Stavroupoli.

Subdivisions
Municipal Unit of Efkarpia: It is located on the northern part of Pavlos Melas and has a population of 13,905 residents.
Municipal Unit of Polichni: It is located on the east side of Pavlos Melas and has a population of 39.332 residents. 
Municipal Unit of Stavroupoli: It is located on the southwest side of Pavlos Melas and has a population of 46,008 residents.

References

External links
Official website of the municipality of Pavlos Melas

Municipalities of Central Macedonia
Populated places in Thessaloniki (regional unit)